Ice stock sport (also known as "Icestocksport" or "Bavarian curling") is a winter sport, somewhat similar to curling.  In German, it is known as Eisstockschießen. Although the sport is traditionally played on an ice surface, events are also held on tarmac in summer.

Competitors slide ice stocks over an ice surface, aiming for a target, or to cover the longest distance. Ice stocks have a gliding surface, to which a stick (ca 30 cm) is attached. The sport is mostly practised in southern Germany, Austria and Trentino-Alto Adige/Südtirol in Italy.

Ice stock has been demonstrated at the Winter Olympic Games on two occasions. Ice stock is also an event in India's Khelo India Winter Games program. The most recent world championship for Ice stock has been the 2022 Ice stock sport World Championships for Women and Men, held on February 22–27 February 2022 in Ritten, Italy in the central village of Klobenstein (Collalbo). It was the 14th time the event has taken place.

History 

Although the sport is probably much older, the first proof of ice stock sport being practised stems from a 16th-century painting by Belgian painter Pieter Brueghel. It would take until the 1930s before the sport became organized. A German federation was established in 1934, and German championships were established two years later.

European Championships were first held in 1951, and World Championships were first held in 1983, after the International Federation Icestock Sport (IFI) had been established. Icestock World Championships has been held for men and women since 1983.

First written mentioning of ice stock sport as messengers arrive to bring news of the capture of Richard Lion-heart to Leopold V, Duke of Austria, who was playing ice stock on the frozen river Danube by Vienna shortly before Christmas 1192.

Source: Vatikan Library, Rom (Pope Celestine III excommunicated Leopold V), and University Library of Karlsruhe at a time when it still was publicly accessible

Disciplines 
There are several disciplines in ice stock sport, of which teams target shooting, individual target and distance shooting are contested in international championships.

Team Game 

In a team game, two teams try to shoot the sticks as close as possible to the "Daube" from the starting point. The stave is placed on the center cross before the start of a turn. If the stave is changed in its position within the target field by an effect that is valid according to the rules, it remains in this new position, which is also decisive for the scoring. It is returned to the center cross if it is outside the target space. There are six turns in total.

A team usually consists of four players, with each player making one try per round. The aim is to get one of your own team's sticks in the best position (i.e. closer to the stave than your opponent). Only sticks that are within the target field are scored.

One of the two teams starts the game by trying to play one of their sticks into the target field through the so-called measure. The opposing team then plays with the aim of getting one of their sticks in the best position. The positions of the sticks already in the target field may be changed by the new sticks. If a stick comes to a standstill outside of the target field, it will be removed. Opposing sticks that are in a better position may be shot out of the field.

The teams, called "Moarschaft" in the language of stick shooters, shoot until all sticks have been played, whereby it is always the team's turn that does not currently have the best position to score. When both teams have played with all their sticks, the turn is over and the team whose stick is in the best position gets stick points. Three stick points are awarded for the stick in the best position, for each additional stick of the same team that is closer to the stave than the next stick of the opponent, there are two more points. If one or more sticks of the team that has a stick in the best position and whose turn it is because the opponent has no more sticks available does not reach or touch the field, three stick points are awarded for the first stick and two for all others points deducted. A game has six turns, i.e. passes. The face-off changes with each turn, regardless of the outcome of the last round. The team with the greater number of stock points receives two profit or game points, the other none. In the event of a tie, each team gets one point. The team with the most winning points wins the tournament. If two teams have the same number of winning points, the winner

Team Target Shooting 
The target competition is held in 4 rounds with 6 attempts each. Up to 60 points can be achieved in each round. For the overall ranking, 2 rounds (= 2 × 4 rounds) are usually played. In championships, the top-ranked players often play another 1 to 2 rounds in a final for victory. The target competition is held both as an individual competition and as a team competition. In the individual competition, one player plays all rounds and is scored individually. In the team competition, a different player plays each round. For the evaluation, the results of the individual players are added together.

1st round: 6 attempts are made on the middle target rings, in which the player's stick should be brought as close as possible to the center cross. The ring that the stick reaches is counted. Rings count from outside to inside: 2, 4, 6, 8 and 10 points.

2nd round: 6 attempts are played on a target stick, which is placed alternately in the marked circles A to F. In the 6 attempts it is important to move the target stick placed in the circles out of the target field, whereby the player's stick should remain in the target field. Depending on the final position of the poles, 0, 2, 5 or 10 points are awarded for each attempt.

3rd round: 3 attempts are made to the left and right rear target (target fragments), in which the player's stick should be brought as close as possible to the center of the rings. The ring that the stick reaches is counted. Rings count from outside to inside: 2, 4, 6, 8 and 10 points.

4th round: 6 attempts are played on a target stick, which is placed in the marked circles A, B, G, H, E and F in sequence. In attempts 1 and 2, the goal is to hit the target stick in such a way that the player's stick comes to a standstill as close as possible to the center cross. In attempts 3 and 4, the aim is to hit the shooting stick so that it comes to a standstill as close as possible to the center cross. In attempts 5 and 6, the aim is to move the shooting stick from the target rings to the rear rings. In attempts 1 to 6, the respective ring that the stick reaches is scored. The rings count 2, 4, 6, 8 and 10 points from the outside to the inside.

Distance Competition 
The technique of long-distance shooting differs significantly from that of team shooting, since it is not necessary to be precise in the length and direction of the shot, but to accelerate the stick as much as possible.

In the distance competition, a single player tries to shoot his stick as far as possible. The athlete has five attempts in the competition, the best of which counts. These must be delivered in a funnel-shaped path. If the stick leaves the lane, the attempt is only valid up to the point of departure. The dimensions of the track change depending on the season. The summer track on asphalt or concrete pavement is slightly narrower than the winter track on (natural) ice. The funnel can be extended as desired, which is also necessary when you consider that the world record is 566 m (achieved by Manfred Zieglgruber , SV Unterneukirchen (D) on Lake Seeon ).

The shooter stands on a stand in the middle of the semicircle when firing the shot. He has space to run out up to the 7 meter line, which is not a matter of course due to the momentum and the kinetic energy acting on the athlete.

All players use the same stick body and sole, but are allowed to use their own sticks. A team score can also be created by summing up the results of several players.

From the spectator's point of view, this discipline has the advantage that even a layperson can judge whether an attempt was successful or not.

Ice surface
During the winter season, icestock sport uses a sheet of ice with areas marked off for play. The winter version uses either natural outdoor ice or an indoor ice rink with specific dimensions, lines, and markings for icestock.

IOC Recognition 
During the International Olympic Committee (IOC)  Session in Tokyo in 2021, the IOC approved full recognition of International Federation Icestocksport.

Notables in International Icestock 

 Aadil Manzoor Peer known as Syed Aadi, is an Indian international ice stock sport athlete.

Gallery

See also
 Ice rink

References

External links
 International Federation Icestock Sport
 Indian Icestock Federation
 Icestocksport Association of Namibia

 
stock
Precision sports
Former Winter Olympic sports
Sports originating in Germany
Winter Olympic Games
Winter Olympic venues
Winter Olympic sports